Polish Association of Artists - "The Capitol" (Polish: Polska Organizacja Artystów Plastyków "Kapitol") - organization established in Italy in 1936. The Association organized a few exhibitions where it presented works of its members.

The authorities of Association:
 president - Jan Dzieślewski;
 other members of Board and Audit Committee: Stefan Bakałowicz, Jadwiga Bohdanowicz, Krystyna Dąbrowska, Józef Gosławski, Leonard Kociewski, Antoni Madeyski, Wiktor Mazurowski, Michał Paszyn, Leon Siemiradzki.

Bibliography

External links 
 

Arts organizations established in 1936
Polish diaspora organizations
Arts organisations based in Italy
Diaspora organisations in Italy
1936 establishments in Italy